Spilarctia thomasi is a moth in the family Erebidae. It was described by Jeremy Daniel Holloway in 1988. It is found on Borneo. The habitat consists of montane areas.

The length of the forewings is 18–23 mm.

References

Moths described in 1988
thomasi